Ulla Nævestad (12 September 1945 – 26 July 2021) was a Norwegian politician for the Conservative Party.

She served as a deputy representative to the Parliament of Norway from Buskerud during the term 1989–1993. In total she met during 61 days of parliamentary session. She served as mayor of Lier from 1995 to 2011.

References

1945 births
2021 deaths
People from Lier, Norway
Deputy members of the Storting
Conservative Party (Norway) politicians
Mayors of places in Buskerud
Women mayors of places in Norway
Women members of the Storting